The Eastern Aramaic languages have developed from the varieties of Aramaic that developed in and around Mesopotamia (Iraq, southeast Turkey, northeast Syria and northwest and southwest Iran), as opposed to western varieties of the Levant (modern Levantine Syria and Lebanon). Most speakers are ethnic Assyrians, although there are a minority of Kurdish Jews and Mandaeans, who also speak varieties of Eastern Aramaic.

Speakers
Numbers of fluent speakers range from approximately 575,000 to 1,000,000, with the main languages being Assyrian Neo-Aramaic  (235,000 speakers), Chaldean Neo-Aramaic (216,000 speakers) and Surayt/Turoyo (250,000 speakers), together with a number of smaller closely related languages with no more than 5,000 to 10,000 speakers between them.

Despite their names, they are not restricted to specific churches; Chaldean Neo-Aramaic being spoken by members of the Chaldean Catholic Church, Assyrian Church of the East, Syriac Orthodox Church, Assyrian Protestant churches, and Assyrian Neo-Aramaic and Turoyo being spoken by members of the Chaldean Catholic Church etc.

In addition, there are approximately 25,000 speakers of Jewish varieties, and some 5000 fluent speakers of the Mandaic language among the some 50,000 Mandaeans, an ethno-gnostic minority in Iraq and Iran.

Students of the Talmud will also have a passive mastery of Jewish Babylonian Aramaic, adding hundreds of thousands of users with varying levels of Aramaic mastery.

History

Historically, eastern varieties of Aramaic have been more dominant, mainly due to their political acceptance in the Neo-Assyrian Empire and Achaemenid Persian empires. With the later loss of political platforms to Greek and Persian, Eastern Aramaic continued to be used by the population of Mesopotamia.

In Assyria, today's modern northern Iraq, south east Turkey and north east Syria, the local variety of eastern Aramaic, known as Syriac (the terms Syrian and Syriac originally being Indo-European derivatives of Assyrian) had emerged by the 5th century BC, and between the 1st and 4th centuries AD became a standard language among the Eastern Rite Christian Assyrians, being used in the Peshitta and by the poet Ephrem, and in the schools of Edessa and Nisibis, and later by the Saint Thomas Christians in India.

In the region of Babylonia (modern Southern Iraq), rabbinical schools flourished, producing the Targumim and Talmud, making the language a standard of religious Jewish scholarship.

Among the Mandaean ethnic community of Khuzestan and Iraq, another variety of eastern Aramaic, known as Mandaic, became the liturgical language of the religion.

These varieties have widely influenced the less prominent Western Aramaic languages of the Levant, and the three classical languages outlined above have also influenced numerous vernacular varieties of Eastern Aramaic, some of which are spoken to this day, largely by ethnic Assyrians and Mandaeans (see Neo-Aramaic languages). Since the Muslim conquest of Persia of the seventh century, most of the population of the Middle East has undergone a gradual but steady language shift to Arabic.

However there are still between some 550,000 - 1,000,000 fluent speakers among the indigenous ethnic Assyrians of northern Iraq, northeast Syria, southeastern Turkey and northwestern Iran, as well as small migrant communities in Lebanon, Israel, Jordan, Armenia, Georgia, southern Russia and Azerbaijan. Most of these are members of the Assyrian Church of the East, Syriac Orthodox Church, Chaldean Catholic Church, Ancient Church of the East, Assyrian Pentecostal Church and Assyrian Evangelical Church. A further number may have a more sparse understanding of the language, due to pressures in their homelands to speak Arabic, Turkish, Persian or Kurdish, and due to the Assyrian Diaspora to the Western World.

References

 
Aramaic languages

mk:Источни арамејски јазици